Fernand Fabre (1899–1987) was a French stage, television and film actor.

Selected filmography
 The Queen's Necklace (1929)
 The Indictment (1931)
 Luck (1931)
 The Weaker Sex (1933)
 Madame Bovary (1934)
 A Man Has Been Stolen (1934)
 Light Cavalry (1935)
 The Mysterious Lady (1936)
 The Man of the Hour (1937)
 My Little Marquise (1938)
 Nights of Princes (1938)
 Colonel Chabert (1943)
 The Stairs Without End (1943)
 The Last Metro (1945)
 Special Mission (1946)
 After Love (1948)
 Bluebeard (1951)

References

Bibliography
 Goble, Alan. The Complete Index to Literary Sources in Film. Walter de Gruyter, 1999.

External links

1899 births
1987 deaths
French male stage actors
French male film actors
French male silent film actors
20th-century French male actors